John C. Collier (1 February 1897 – 28 December 1940) was a Scottish footballer and manager.

Career
Born in Dysart, Fife, Collier played for Inverkeithing Juniors and had trials for the Scottish Junior international team. He signed for Raith Rovers and eventually signed for Hull City in 1920. He captained Hull for a couple of seasons, before moving to Queens Park Rangers in 1926.

He joined York City as player-manager, but broke an ankle and retired from playing. He managed the club as they entered the Football League, but after their first season in the league he left the club to become a publican.

Collier was re-appointed as manager in May 1933. He announced his retirement from football in March 1937, and went into a business partnership with one of his brothers in Scotland. He died in Kingston upon Hull, East Riding of Yorkshire, in 1940, at the age of 43. His brother William Collier was also a footballer who played once for Scotland.

References

External links

1897 births
1940 deaths
Scottish footballers
Scottish Junior Football Association players 
Raith Rovers F.C. players
Inverkeithing United F.C. players
Hull City A.F.C. players
Queens Park Rangers F.C. players
York City F.C. players
English Football League players
Midland Football League players
Scottish football managers
York City F.C. managers
English Football League managers
People from Dysart, Fife
Footballers from Fife
Association football wing halves